During the 1998–99 English football season, Notts County F.C. competed in the Football League Second Division.

Season summary
In the 1998–99 season Notts County finished in 16th position, 4 points clear of the relegation zone.

Final league table

 Pld = Matches ; W = Matches won; D = Matches drawn; L = Matches lost; F = Goals for; A = Goals against; GD = Goal difference; Pts = Points
 NB: In the Football League goals scored (F) takes precedence over goal difference (GD).

Results
Notts County's score comes first

Legend

Football League Second Division

FA Cup

League Cup

Football League Trophy

Squad

References

Notts County F.C. seasons
Notts County